BAP Chipana (SS-34) is one of two Type 209/1200 submarines ordered by the Peruvian Navy on March 21, 1977. She was built by the German shipbuilder Howaldtswerke Deutsche Werft AG at its shipyard in Kiel.

History

Origin 
She was originally named Blume after the 19th-century engineer Federico Blume, however on April 21, 1980, she was renamed after the battle of Chipana which took place between naval forces of Peru and Chile on April 12, 1879. Following sea trials in the North Sea, she arrived at her home port of Callao in 1983.

Modernization 

In 2018, the BAP Chipana began the process of being modernized by SIMA. The submarine was split in order to replace its mechanical and control equipment. Electrical, navigation and propulsion systems were also upgraded. The German marine company ThyssenKrupp Marine Systems assisted Peru with the program, being awarded €40 million to help upgrade Peru's submarines.

The other three submarines of the same class – BAP Angamos, BAP Antofagasta and BAP Pisagua – were also destined to be upgraded following the completion of work performed on the BAP Chipana.

References

Sources 
Baker III, Arthur D., The Naval Institute Guide to Combat Fleets of the World 2002-2003. Naval Institute Press, 2002.
Ortiz Sotelo, Jorge, Apuntes para la historia de los submarinos peruanos. Biblioteca Nacional, 2001.

1981 ships
Type 209 submarines of the Peruvian Navy
Ships built in Kiel